Ruth Esther Pointer (born March 19, 1946) is an American singer–songwriter who is best known as the eldest and last surviving original member of the American family vocal group the Pointer Sisters.

Career
Joining her sisters in 1972, the Pointer Sisters released their first album in 1973. The group eventually found fame with songs like "Yes We Can Can" (1973), their country crossover hit, "Fairytale" (1974) and "How Long (Betcha Got a Chick on the Side)" before Bonnie's exit in 1977. Continuing as a trio, the group found their biggest success covering tunes of rock, pop and new wave with singles such as "Fire" (1978), "He's So Shy" (1980), and "Slow Hand" (1981).

The group found its biggest success with the release of the Break Out album in 1983 which featured hits such as "Automatic", "Jump (For My Love)", a re-released version of "I'm So Excited", "Neutron Dance", and "Baby Come And Get It". It's notable for featuring Ruth's lead vocals on "Automatic" and "Neutron Dance", which hit the top ten of the Billboard Hot 100 Chart and led to the group winning two Grammy Awards. In 1988, Pointer provided the singing voice of the character Rita the Disney film Oliver & Company, where she sang the song "Streets of Gold" as well as a reprise of the song "Why Should I Worry" with fellow cast member Billy Joel. They were joined by Ruth's daughter Issa in the 1990s. The group was given a star on the Hollywood Walk of Fame in 1994.

In October 2021, Pointer competed in season six of The Masked Singer as "Cupcake". Pointer revealed upon her unmasking that she was supposed to perform on the show as part of a duo with her sister Anita in a duplicated and recolored Cupcake costume. Anita was dealing with an illness, forcing Ruth to perform alone.

With the death of Anita Pointer on December 31, 2022, Ruth Pointer is the last surviving founding member of The Pointer Sisters.

Personal life
Pointer has been married five times and has five children. The eldest are a daughter Faun (born 1965) and a son Malik (born 1966). Malik is a singer. Her daughter Issa Pointer (born 1978), is from a 1977 marriage with former Temptations member Dennis Edwards. In 1984, Pointer married noted bassist Don Boyette, divorcing in 1988.

Pointer married Michael Sayles in 1990 and, at the age of 47 in 1993, she gave birth to twins, a boy named Conor and a girl named Ali. Both Issa Pointer and Ruth's granddaughter Sadako Pointer (born 1984) have performed as members of the Pointer Sisters.

References

External links

1946 births
Living people
The Pointer Sisters members
20th-century African-American women singers
American contraltos
American women singer-songwriters
American rhythm and blues singer-songwriters
American rhythm and blues singers
Musicians from Oakland, California
Ruth
Singer-songwriters from California
African-American songwriters
21st-century African-American people
21st-century African-American women
United Service Organizations entertainers